Nguenar Ndiaye (born 10 January 1995) is a Senegalese footballer who plays as a forward for French club Bourges Foot 18 and the Senegal women's national team.

International career
Ndiaye capped for Senegal at senior level during the 2018 Africa Women Cup of Nations qualification.

References

External links

1995 births
Living people
Senegalese women's footballers
Women's association football forwards
Bourges Foot 18 players
Senegal women's international footballers
Senegalese expatriate footballers
Senegalese expatriate sportspeople in France
Expatriate women's footballers in France